Carl L. Marcellino (born December 23, 1942) is an American politician who served as a member of the New York State Senate from 1995 to 2018. He was first elected in a March 1995 special election following the resignation of former state senate majority leader Ralph J. Marino; he was defeated by Jim Gaughran in 2018. Marcellino represented the 5th district, which comprises parts of Nassau and Suffolk counties on Long Island. Marcellino is a member of the Republican Party.

Life and career 
Marcellino attended public schools in Queens, New York. He received a Bachelor of Arts and Master of Science degree from New York University. Marcellino worked as a science teacher and administrator in the New York City school system for 20 years. Prior to serving in the State Senate, he was Town Clerk of Oyster Bay. Marcellino and his wife Patricia reside in Syosset, New York and have two children, Jean and Carl.

New York State Senate 
In November 1994, Ralph J. Marino, who had represented the area around the Nassau-Suffolk line since 1969, was deposed from his post as Senate Majority Leader. After Marino resigned from office, a special election was called for on March 13, 1995. Marcellino was nominated by Republicans to face Mary A. McCaffery, a Democrat who worked as a fund-raiser for nonprofit agencies. He would go on to easily win that race with 60% of the vote. Marcellino would go on to win re-election eleven times, only facing serious opposition in 2016; that year, Marcellino defeated challenger Jim Gaughran by only 1,761 votes. In 2018, Gaughran challenged Marcellino again. This time, Gaughran prevailed.

In 2011, Marcellino voted against allowing same-sex marriage in New York during a senate roll-call vote on the Marriage Equality Act, which the Senate narrowly passed 33–29. He also voted in favor of the 2013 gun control law known as the NY SAFE Act.

See also 
2009 New York State Senate leadership crisis

References

External links 
New York State Senate: Carl L. Marcellino

|-

|-

Republican Party New York (state) state senators
1942 births
Living people
People from Syosset, New York
21st-century American politicians